The Catholic Church in Seychelles is part of the worldwide Catholic Church, under the spiritual leadership of the Pope.

There are around 70,000 Catholics in the Seychelles - almost 76.2% of the total population.  Seychelles forms a single diocese - the Diocese of Port Victoria.

References

External links
 http://www.catholic-hierarchy.org/diocese/dpvos.html

 
Seychelles
Seychelles